Evfemija Štorga (born October 7, 1975 in Medvode) is a retired female  javelin thrower from Slovenia. She set her personal best (61.14 metres) in 2000.

Achievements

References
 sports-reference

1975 births
Living people
Slovenian female javelin throwers
Athletes (track and field) at the 2000 Summer Olympics
Olympic athletes of Slovenia
Universiade medalists in athletics (track and field)
Universiade silver medalists for Slovenia
Medalists at the 1999 Summer Universiade